The Bell R-12 (later redesignated H-12; company Model 48)  was an American 1940s military utility helicopter built by the Bell Helicopter company.

Design and development
During 1946, Bell Helicopter began development of a new utility helicopter, the Model 42, much larger than the Model 47, which utilized a scaled-up version of the Model 47's rotor system. Three prototypes were built, but serious rotor problems and complexity of mechanical systems precluded production. The initial Model 42 variant was civilian, but the United States Air Force ordered the development of its military variant, the Model 48. Two prototypes were ordered as the XR-12, powered by a single  Pratt & Whitney R-1340-AN-1 radial engine and featuring seating for five. Of very similar construction to the Model 42, the Model 48 had a shorter rotor mast. A production batch of 34 helicopters was ordered, under the designation R-12A, but cancelled in 1947.

Another enlarged prototype (the XR-12B, Model 48A) with seats for eight plus two pilots and a more powerful  Pratt & Whitney R-1340-55 engine was also ordered, followed by ten pre-series YR-12B helicopters, with a glazed nose, instead of the car-like nose of the Model 42 and XR-12. While under flight test the helicopter was redesignated the H-12, but the results were not satisfactory, as there were major problems with the main rotor due to blade weaving and poor rotor governor performance.

Operational history
No production H-12 aircraft were built but the prototypes and preproduction aircraft were used for various test and development programs.

Variants
Model 42
Bell's initial foray into the civilian luxury helicopter market, seating five. Three prototypes were built but serious problems precluded production.
Model 48
Company designation for the military version of the Model 42, given the designation R-12. Two built as XR-12s and a production contract for 34 was cancelled in 1947.
Model 48A
The more powerful derivative of the Model 48 with a 600 hp engine and ten seats. One XR-12B/XH-12B prototype was produced and a preproduction batch of ten were also built as YR-12B/YH-12Bs
XR-12
Prototype, redesignated XH-12, two built.
R-12A
Production version, 34 on order canceled.
XR-12B
Prototype with more powerful engine and increased seating, redesignated XH-12B, one built.
YR-12B
As XR-12B but with R-1340-55 engines, redesignated YH-12B, ten built.
XH-12
XR-12 redesignated in 1947.
XH-12B
XR-12B redesignated in 1947.
YH-12B
YR-12B redesignated in 1947.

Operators

United States Air Force

Specifications (XR-12B)

See also

References
Notes

Bibliography

 Andrade, John M. U.S.Military Aircraft Designation and Serials since 1909. Leicester, UK: Midland Counties Publications, 1979. .
 The Illustrated Encyclopedia of Aircraft (Part Work 1982–1985). London, Orbis Publishing, 1985.
 Pelletier, A.J. Bell Aircraft since 1935. London: Putnam & Company Ltd., 1992. .

External links

 Copter Ferry Hops To The Front – Popular Science (December 1950)

H-012
1940s United States military utility aircraft
1940s United States helicopters
Single-engined piston helicopters
Aircraft first flown in 1946